Negasso Gidada Solon (8 September 1943 – 27 April 2019) was an Ethiopian politician who was the president of Ethiopia from 1995 until 2001.

Biography
Negasso was the son of Gidada Solon, one of the first local ministers of a Protestant church in the Dembidolo area in western Ethiopia.

Negasso held a doctorate in social history from the Goethe University in Frankfurt-am-Main and was a part-time lecturer of history at Addis Ababa University. The title of his doctoral thesis was "History of the Sayyoo Oromo of Southwestern Wallaga, Ethiopia, from about 1730 to 1886". He was married to Regina Abelt, a German nurse and midwife. Being the First Lady of Ethiopia while holding the German Citizenship earned Abelt considerable, yet unwanted, attention by the German and European tabloid press.  In marked contrast, Regina Abelt was virtually invisible in Ethiopia and never enjoyed the official title of First Lady which was instead used by the wife of the Prime Minister.

Negasso died in Germany on 27 April 2019, after battling health issues.

Political career 
In Europe, he was an active member of the Oromo Liberation Front (OLF). Negasso had been Minister of Information in the Transitional Government of Ethiopia and Central Committee member of the Oromo People's Democratic Organisation (OPDO) when he became president on 22 August 1995. He left office when his term expired on 8 October 2001. Before the end of his term, he was expelled from both the OPDO and the EPRDF coalition on 22 June.

In the 2005 general elections, Negasso was elected to the Ethiopian House of People's Representatives as an independent from Dembidolo in the Mirab Welega Zone of the Oromia Region.

In July 2008, Negasso became a founding member of the Forum for Democratic Dialogue (FDD), a new coalition of opposition parties and activists. Then in November 2009, he announced he had joined the Unity for Democracy and Justice Party (UDJ), one of the eight parties in the FDD, "to try to unite Ethiopia". At the time of his announcement, he also asked forgiveness from Ethiopians for deceiving them that Ethiopia's current constitution was ratified in 1995 with full participation of all political parties in a democratic manner. "There were a number of political parties that were excluded from the process," he said during the ceremony when he and Siye Abraha were officially inducted into the UDJ.

References

External links
 
 
 
 
 
 
 Media ETHIOPIA People in Ethiopia

 

 
 
 
 

1943 births
2019 deaths
Academic staff of Addis Ababa University
People from Oromia Region
Members of the House of Peoples' Representatives
Presidents of Ethiopia
Goethe University Frankfurt alumni
Medrek politicians
Unity for Democracy and Justice politicians
Oromo Democratic Party politicians
Ethiopian Protestants
Oromo people
Labor ministers of Ethiopia
Communication ministers of Ethiopia 
Ethiopian historians
People of the Ethiopian Civil War
20th-century Ethiopian politicians
21st-century Ethiopian politicians